Chris D'Lacey (born 15 December 1954) is an English writer of children's fiction, he is best known for writing The Last Dragon Chronicles. He has also written many other books including A Dark Inheritance.

Biography

Chris D'Lacey was born in Valletta, Malta,  but as a child moved first to Leicester and then to Bolton. After gaining a degree in biology from the University of York, he returned to Leicester and got a job at the University of Leicester in the Pre-Clinical Sciences department.

Originally his writing was confined to songs and he didn't turn to fiction until he was 32. His first piece of work was a 250,000 word story about polar bears for his wife, Jay, to accompany a stuffed polar bear he had bought her as a Christmas present.

He didn't write another story for seven years, until he heard about a competition to write a story for young children with a prize of £2,000. The resulting book, A Hole at the Pole, also about polar bears, didn't win – but he sent it off to a publisher, who accepted it.

His first children's novel, Fly, Cherokee, Fly, was published in 1998 and subsequently shortlisted for the Carnegie Medal. It was inspired by the time he found an injured pigeon in Victoria Park and nursed it back to health at home. After recovering,  it lived another 14 years freely coming and going from a nest box attached to the back of the house. All of its offspring were given the names of different Native American tribes, which is where the title of the book comes from.

He has since written over twenty children's books, including Pawnee Warrior (a sequel to Fly, Cherokee, Fly), a collaborative novel with fellow children's author Linda Newbery (From E To You), and the best-selling, award-winning The Last Dragon Chronicles and "The Erth Dragons." His books often contain environmental themes and events based on things that have happened to him.

In July 2002 he was awarded an honorary doctorate from the University of Leicester for his contributions to children's literature. Although writing is now his main source of income, he still works at the university as the operator of the confocal microscope.

His favorite children's books are the Paddington Bear series and The Hobbit, and his favorite children's authors are Allan Ahlberg and Roald Dahl.

Awards and nominations

 1998 Fly, Cherokee, Fly shortlisted for the Carnegie Medal
 2002 The Fire Within won the Rotherham Children's Book Award
 2002 Honorary doctorate from the University of Leicester
 2005 Horace shortlisted for the Bolton Children's Book Award
 2005 Horace shortlisted for the Hampshire Book Award
 2006 Icefire shortlisted for the Angus Book Award
2010  Gruffen won the Books Factor Award.

References

External links
 Chris d'Lacey's official website
 Chris d'Lacey at Fantastic Fiction

English children's writers
Living people
1954 births
Alumni of the University of York
People associated with the University of Leicester
People from Valletta
English male novelists